Shchukinskaya is a railway station of Line D2 of the Moscow Central Diameters in Moscow. It was opened on 25 June 2021. It took the transport functions of Pokrovskoye-Streshnevo railway station, which was simultaneously closed.

Gallery

References

Railway stations in Moscow
Railway stations of Moscow Railway
Line D2 (Moscow Central Diameters) stations